is a Japanese politician of the Liberal Democratic Party. He is a member of the House of Representatives in the Diet (national legislature) and is the former Minister of Justice under Aso's Administration.

A native of Katsuura, Chiba and graduate of Tohoku University, he joined Kawasaki Heavy Industries in 1974 and received a Ph.D in engineering. He was elected to the House of Representatives for the first time in 1990. His grandfather is former member of the House of Representatives Nobuteru Mori, his father is former Minister of the Environment Yoshihide Mori, and his uncle is former  Kiyomoto Mori.  In the Cabinet of Prime Minister Taro Aso, appointed on 24 September 2008, Mori was appointed Minister of Justice.  This was his first appointment to the Cabinet.

Mori is affiliated to the openly revisionist lobby Nippon Kaigi.

References

External links
 

|-

|-

|-

1948 births
Living people
People from Katsuura, Chiba
Politicians from Chiba Prefecture
Tohoku University alumni
Members of the House of Representatives (Japan)
Ministers of Justice of Japan
Liberal Democratic Party (Japan) politicians
Members of Nippon Kaigi
21st-century Japanese politicians